Kyle A. Williams (born March 19, 1984 in Stockton, California) is a former American football offensive tackle. He was signed by the Seahawks as an undrafted free agent in 2007. He played college football at Southern California.

Early years
Williams began his high school career at St. Mary's High School in Stockton, California, before transferring to Highland Park High School in Dallas, Texas. He was a member of the West Squad for the 2002 U.S. Army All-American Bowl.

College career
Williams played college football at the University of Southern California.  Williams was invited to play in the 2007 Texas vs. The Nation College All Star Game.  He is currently one of only 4 offensive lineman in college football history to block for three Heisman Trophy winners, Carson Palmer, Matt Leinart and Reggie Bush.

Professional career

Seattle Seahawks
Williams signed with the National Football League's Seattle Seahawks in April, 2007.

Personal
Williams is the nephew of former NFL defensive tackle Eric Williams. Additionally, his grandfather Roy O. Williams played for the San Francisco 49ers in 1963. His other grandfather, Rod Rojas, was a 3 sport lettermen for Lehigh University.

External links
Seattle Seahawks bio
USC Trojans bio

1984 births
Living people
Players of American football from Stockton, California
American football offensive tackles
USC Trojans football players
Seattle Seahawks players